Ugochi Nwaigwe (born May 3, 1993) is an American-born Nigerian basketball player for Yakın Doğu Üniversitesi and the Nigerian national team.

Wagner and Temple statistics 
Source

International career
She participated at the 2017 Women's Afrobasket.

References

1993 births
Living people
Nigerian women's basketball players
Nigerian expatriate basketball people in Spain
Nigerian expatriate basketball people in Turkey
Centers (basketball)
Temple Owls women's basketball players